The sixth season of Beverly Hills, 90210, an American drama television series aired from September 13, 1995 on Fox and concluded on May 22, 1996 after 32 episodes. This season follows the gang during their junior year of college as they struggles with issues such as dysfunctional families, relationships, hostage situations, sexism, abstinence, organized crime, sexual misconduct, grief, and drug abuse.

The season aired Wednesday nights at 8/9c in the United States averaging 9.8 million viewers a week, 4.9 million viewers fewer than the fifth season. It was released on DVD in 2008.

Overview
The gang returns to Beverly Hills for their Junior year of college. Now that his house is empty, Brandon decide to turn the old Walsh house to his own mancave.  Kelly returns from New York with a new image and a new man. Dylan begins to piece together who murdered his father three years earlier, while David searches for his mother for the first time since his parents' mysterious divorce eight years earlier. Donna and Ray are still going strong despite what happened in Palm Springs. Still estranged from the group, Valarie tries to make amends to the group, but it backfires when an old friend comes back to ruin her new slate. Clare and Steve begin to grow closer.

Cast

Starring
Jason Priestley as Brandon Walsh 
Jennie Garth as Kelly Taylor  
Ian Ziering as Steve Sanders 
Luke Perry as Dylan McKay (episodes 1–10)
Brian Austin Green as David Silver  
Tori Spelling as Donna Martin 
Tiffani Thiessen as Valerie Malone  
Joe E. Tata as Nat Bussichio  
Jamie Walters as Ray Pruit (episodes 1–13, 30)
Kathleen Robertson as Clare Arnold

Recurring
Ann Gillespie as Jackie Taylor 
Jason Wiles as Colin Robbins 
Emma Caulfield as Susan Keats
Cameron Bancroft as Joe Bradley
Stanley Kamel as Tony Marchette 
Denise Dowse as Vice Principal Yvonne Teasley 
Rebecca Gayheart as Antonia Marchette
Paige Moss as Tara Marks 
Mary Crosby as Claudia Van Eyck

Notable guest stars
Carol Potter as Cindy Walsh 
Gabrielle Carteris as Andrea Zuckerman-Vasquez 
James Eckhouse as Jim Walsh

Episodes

Source:

References

1995 American television seasons
1996 American television seasons
Beverly Hills, 90210 seasons